"A free admonition without any fees / To warne the Papistes to beware of three trees" is an English broadside ballad published by William Birch in 1571 and is not currently set to any tune An original copy of the ballad is located in the Huntington Library, however online facsimiles are available for public consumption.

Synopsis
The first lines of this ballad, "If that you be / not past all / grace, / O Papystes / heare mee / speake, / Let reason / rule, and / truth take / place, / Cease you from that you seeke," firmly cement its religious theme. The speaker asks those who associate themselves with papist group to cease seeking God through a Catholic vein, and conform to the religious ideology of the Protestant Reformation. While the term "papist" became an anti-Catholic slur in the mid-19th century, in the sixteenth-century it simply identified those who pledged their religious allegiance to the Pope. Nevertheless, the ballad pleads with the papists to forsake the Catholic religion and be "grafted in this stock" of emerging Protestantism.

References

External links
Textual transcription of the English broadside ballad 'A free admonition without any fees / To warne the Papistes to beware of three trees'' at the English Broadside Ballad Archive of UC Santa Barbara.

1571 works
English Reformation